The Clovis-Portales Combined Statistical Area is made up of two counties in east central New Mexico. The statistical area consists of the Clovis Micropolitan Statistical Area and the Portales Micropolitan Statistical Area. As of the 2000 census, the CSA had a population of 63,062 (though a July 1, 2009 estimate placed the population at 63,224).

Counties
Curry County
Roosevelt County

Communities
Cannon AFB
Causey
Clovis (Principal city)
Dora
Elida
Floyd
Grady
Kenna
Melrose
Milnesand
Portales (Principal city)
Texico

Demographics
As of the census of 2000, there were 63,062 people, 23,405 households, and 16,411 families residing within the CSA. The racial makeup of the CSA was 72.90% White, 5.37% African American, 1.03% Native American, 1.45% Asian, 0.11% Pacific Islander, 15.70% from other races, and 3.43% from two or more races. Hispanic or Latino of any race were 31.21% of the population.

The median income for a household in the CSA was $27,752, and the median income for a family was $32,857. Males had a median income of $25,628 versus $20,104 for females. The per capita income for the CSA was $14,617.

See also
List of metropolitan areas in New Mexico
List of micropolitan areas in New Mexico
List of cities in New Mexico

References

Metropolitan areas of New Mexico
Curry County, New Mexico
Roosevelt County, New Mexico
Demographics of New Mexico
Combined statistical areas of the United States
Portales, New Mexico